The Los Angeles Port Police Association, Inc (LAPPA) is the official employees organization of Port police officers. The Association was incorporated on January 5, 1993.

The purpose of the police association is to represent its active members in employment relations and matters of working conditions with the City of Los Angeles.  Additionally, LAPPA is actively involved in supporting and promoting the surrounding communities of San Pedro and Wilmington.

In furtherance of its goals, the Association is an affiliate member of the International Longshore and Warehouse Union as local 65.  The ILWU represents 42,000 members in over 60 local unions in the states of California, Washington, Oregon, Alaska and Hawaii.

As of December 2005, and together with the Los Angeles Police Command Officers Association, the Los Angeles Port Police Association was one of the few unions to be up-to-date with its financial reports to the State of California.

The Los Angeles Port Police Association did not file returns with the Internal Revenue Service for three years in a row, and the Internal Revenue Service revoked its 501(c)(5) tax-exempt status on October 15, 2010.

References 

Trade unions in California
Organizations established in 1993
International Longshore and Warehouse Union
1993 establishments in California
Police unions in the United States